Moombahton is an electronic dance music genre, derived from house music and reggaeton, that was created by American DJ and producer Dave Nada in Washington, D.C., in 2009. Nada coined the name as a portmanteau of "Moombah" (a track by Surinamese house DJ Chuckie and Dutch producer/DJ Silvio Ecomo) and reggaeton (itself a neologism combining reggae with the Spanish suffix -ton, signifying big).

Characteristics 
Identifying characteristics of moombahton include a thick and spread-out bass line, dramatic builds, and a two-step pulse with quick drum fills. Occasionally moombahton includes rave music synthesizers and a cappella rap samples. Musically, moombahton mixes the rhythmic origins of Dutch house or house music, the slow tempo of reggaeton, usually between 100-110bpm, accompanied by bouncy percussions from reggaeton.

History 

Moombahton was created by Dave Nada in late 2009 while DJing his cousin's high school cut party in Washington, D.C. He blended the house and club music which he had planned to play with the reggaeton and bachata the guests were previously listening to by slowing down Afrojack's remix of Silvio Ecomo and Chuckie's song "Moombah!" from 128 bpm to 108 bpm, to create the basis of the genre.

Between late 2009 and early 2010, Nada worked on a five track extended play of moombahton that was released in March 2010, with the support of the DJ Ayres and the DJ Tittsworth at T&A Records.

Subgenres

Moombahcore 
Moombahcore is a derivation of moombahton with dubstep influences, also incorporating elements of newstyle hardcore, breakcore, and techstep. Moombahcore fused dubstep drums and moombahton tempo (100-115 BPM), incorporating elements such as wobble bass, FM synths, distorted basslines, and complex percussion patterns.

Moombahsoul 
Moombahsoul is a subgenre of moombahton with deep house influences. It combines the elements of soul, lofi, deep house and chill with moombahton backed drums and textures. David Heartbreak put together one of the genres first compilations in 2011 entitled 'HEARTBREAK presents MOOMBAHSOUL'. The 15 track compilation included tracks by Munchi, Heartbreak, DJ Theory & More.

See also
 House music
 Reggaeton
 List of moombahcore musicians
 Dubstep
 Deep house

References

 
Reggaeton
Reggae fusion
Urbano music genres
Electronic dance music genres
Reggae genres
2010s in music